Oregon is a village in Dane County, Wisconsin. As of the census of 2020, the population was 11,179. Oregon is part of the Madison Metropolitan Statistical Area. The village is located mostly within the Town of Oregon.

History
Oregon was settled in 1841 by Bartlet Runey, and the first house was constructed in 1843. Initially the settlement was known as "Rome Corners," and there is a road south of the village which still bears that name. When the Chicago and North Western Transportation Company came through the village in 1864, their maps indicated a name of "Oregon," and the name was adopted. The village was incorporated in 1881.

Many of Oregon's historical buildings still stand in the downtown district, including the Netherwood Block on the south, the Badger Cycle Company building and original water tower on the southeast on Janesville Street, and numerous business lining the west side of North and South Main Street. The Red Brick School, one of the more distinguishable structures in the village, built in 1922 as the high school, stands north of downtown. It was recently restored and now serves as the business offices for the Gorman Company.

Geography

Oregon is located at  (42.923899, −89.382304).

Oregon is served primarily by US-14 and Wisconsin Highway 138 and the two highways meet at the village's southeast corner. US-14 previously ran through the village, travelling down North Main Street and then arcing along Janesville Street, but a bypass was constructed from 1976 to 1978 along the northern and eastern sides of the village. The previous route is now signed as County Trunk MM.

Demographics

2020 census
As of the census of 2020, the population was 11,179. The racial makeup of the village was 90.1% White, 1.5% Black or African American, 1.2% Asian, 0.2% Native American, 1.4% from other races, and 5.7% from two or more races. Ethnically, the population was 4.0% Hispanic or Latino of any race.

2010 census
As of the census of 2010, there were 9,232 people, 3,589 households, and 2,527 families living in the village. The racial makeup of the village was 95.4% White, 1.2% African American, 0.2% Native American, 0.8% Asian, 0.2% Pacific Islander, 0.8% from other races, and 1.5% from two or more races. Hispanic or Latino of any race were 2.2% of the population.

There were 3,589 households, of which 40.8% had children under the age of 18 living with them, 55.6% were married couples living together, 10.3% had a female householder with no husband present, 4.5% had a male householder with no wife present, and 29.6% were non-families. 23.8% of all households were made up of individuals, and 7.9% had someone living alone who was 65 years of age or older. The average household size was 2.55 and the average family size was 3.04.

The median age in the village was 37 years. 28.6% of residents were under the age of 18; 6.1% were between the ages of 18 and 24; 28.8% were from 25 to 44; 26.8% were from 45 to 64; and 9.6% were 65 years of age or older. The gender makeup of the village was 47.8% male and 52.2% female.

2000 census
As of the census of 2000, there were 7,514 people, 2,796 households, and 2,071 families living in the village. The population density was 2,451.2 people per square mile (945.0/km2). There were 2,895 housing units at an average density of 944.4 per square mile (364.1/km2). The racial makeup of the village was 97.71% White, 0.56% Black or African American, 0.19% Native American, 0.67% Asian, 0.19% from other races, and 0.69% from two or more races. 0.67% of the population were Hispanic or Latino of any race.

There were 2,796 households, out of which 43.5% had children under the age of 18 living with them, 61.9% were married couples living together, 8.8% had a female householder with no husband present, and 25.9% were non-families. 20.4% of all households were made up of individuals, and 7.3% had someone living alone who was 65 years of age or older. The average household size was 2.66 and the average family size was 3.10.

In the village, the population was spread out, with 30.5% under the age of 18, 5.9% from 18 to 24, 34.5% from 25 to 44, 20.3% from 45 to 64, and 8.7% who were 65 years of age or older. The median age was 34 years. For every 100 females, there were 94.6 males. For every 100 females age 18 and over, there were 88.8 males.

The median income for a household in the village was $56,584, and the median income for a family was $65,518. Males had a median income of $43,015 versus $30,791 for females. The per capita income for the village was $23,650. About 1.8% of families and 3.3% of the population were below the poverty line, including 3.4% of those under age 18 and 10.0% of those age 65 or over.

Education
The Oregon School District serves the area. Schools in the district include Brooklyn Elementary, Netherwood Knoll Elementary, Prairie View Elementary, Forest Edge Elementary, Rome Corners Intermediate, Oregon Middle School and Oregon High School.

Oregon emergency services
The Oregon Police Department and the Oregon Area Fire/EMS District serve the area.

Religion
 Community of Life
 Deer Park Buddhist Center and Monastery is located in Oregon.
 Faith Evangelical Lutheran Church
 First Presbyterian Church
 Hillcrest Bible Church
 Holy Mother of Consolation Parish
 People's United Methodist Church
 St. John's Lutheran Church (ELCA)
 Vineyard

Honors
In 2011, Oregon was named one of the "100 Best Small Places to Live" by CNN Money.

Notable people

 Micah Alberti, actor and model
 Kevin J. Anderson, author
 Lyman F. Anderson, Wisconsin State Representative
 Wallace W. Andrew, Wisconsin State Representative
 Jerry Frei, former head coach of the Oregon Ducks and NFL assistant coach
 Christopher J. Rollis, newspaper editor and Wisconsin State Representative
 Jeffrey B. Skiles, Miracle on the Hudson co-pilot
 Shaka Smart, head coach of Marquette University's men's basketball team
 Lisa Stone, former UW–Madison basketball coach

References

External links

 Oregon, Wisconsin Chamber of Commerce
 Village of Oregon
 Oregon Public Library
 Oregon Area Historical Society
 Sanborn fire insurance maps: 1894 1899 1910

Villages in Wisconsin
Villages in Dane County, Wisconsin
Madison, Wisconsin, metropolitan statistical area
Populated places established in 1841
1841 establishments in Wisconsin Territory